Stillman Farmstead is a historic farm complex and national historic district located at Mexico in Oswego County, New York. The district includes three contributing structures; the farmhouse, a mid-19th-century barn (1840), and a large garage (c. 1905). The farmhouse is a -story frame building built in 1889 in the Queen Anne style.

It was listed on the National Register of Historic Places in 1991.

References

Farms on the National Register of Historic Places in New York (state)
Historic districts on the National Register of Historic Places in New York (state)
Historic districts in Oswego County, New York
National Register of Historic Places in Oswego County, New York